Ammirato is an Italian surname. Notable people with the surname include:

Domenico Ammirato (1833–1883), Italian painter
Scipione Ammirato (1531–1601), Italian historian
Tommaso Ammirato (died 1438), Italian Roman Catholic bishop

See also
Mary Ammirato-Collins, American artist and poet

Italian-language surnames